Marzahn is a railway station in the Marzahn-Hellersdorf district of Berlin. It is served by the S-Bahn line . The major shopping mall Eastgate Berlin is located next to the station and linked to it by a footbridge.

References

Marzahn
Marzahn station
Railway stations in Germany opened in 1898